The Carillon Hotel & Spa,  and the Carillon Residences, formerly known as Canyon Ranch Miami Beach, is a complex of three high rise luxury condominiums in North Beach, Miami Beach, Florida, United States. It is located on the beachfront on the east side of Collins Avenue between 68th and 69th Streets. The Carillon Hotel & Spa complex includes The Carillon Hotel & Spa North Tower, the 20 floor The Carillon Hotel & Spa South Tower, The Carillon Hotel building located between The Carillon Hotel & Spa Towers on Collins Avenue, as well as the proposed Golden Sands Canyon Ranch proposed to be built north of The Carillon Hotel & Spa North Tower. The old Golden Sands Hotel and Lounge is being demolished to make way for the new Golden Sands building. The 15-story Carillion Hotel building was built in 1955 but was vacant for 15 years until it was renovated in 2007 and became part of the Canyon Ranch complex. The Carillon Hotel & Spa North Tower looks like two separate, connected towers, but both are the North Tower building.

Gallery

See also
List of tallest buildings in Miami Beach

References

Residential skyscrapers in Miami Beach, Florida
Skyscraper hotels in Miami Beach, Florida
Residential buildings completed in 2008
Hotel buildings completed in 2008
2008 establishments in Florida
Arquitectonica buildings